Yazi is a town in China.

References

Township-level divisions of Shandong